DBox may refer to:

DBox2, a set-top box
D-Box Technologies, motion systems for entertainment etc